A tycoon is a business magnate, an entrepreneur of great influence or importance.

Tycoon may also refer to:

Taikun (大君), a Japanese term of Chinese extraction, the origin of the English word "tycoon"

Film and television
Tycoon (1947 film), starring John Wayne
Tycoon (2002 film), about Russian oligarchs
Tycoon (TV series), a reality television series fronted by English entrepreneur Peter Jones
The Tycoon (TV series), a 1960s American TV sitcom starring Walter Brennan

Music
Tycoon (band), a 1970s rock group
Tycoon (musical), an English adaption of the French rock opera Starmania
 Tycoon (album), by No Trigger, 2012

Other media
Tycoon (novel), by Harold Robbins
Tycoon game or business simulation game, a genre of video games, including:
Tycoon (video game), a 1980 game for the TRS-80

Other uses
The Tycoon, a nickname for Abraham Lincoln, the 16th president of United States

See also 
Ty Coon, American football player